Neomachlotica actinota is a species of sedge moth in the genus Neomachlotica. It was described by Walsingham in 1914. It is found in Central America.

References

Moths described in 1914
Glyphipterigidae